John Garland may refer to:

 Johannes de Garlandia (philologist) (fl. c. 1205–1255), also called Jean de Garlande, John of Garlande
 Johannes de Garlandia (music theorist) (fl. c. 1270–1320), also called Jean de Garlande, John of Garlande
 John Garland (cricketer) (1875–1938), Australian cricketer
 John Garland (general) (1792–1861), United States career soldier with a notable service during the Mexican-American War
 John Garland (Australian politician) (1862–1921), New South Wales Attorney-General
 John J. Garland (1873–1925), Canadian politician
 John W. Garland, United States university president and lawyer
 Juan Garland (died 1775), an Irish military engineer in the service of Spain

See also
 Jack Garland (disambiguation)
 Jon Garland, Major League Baseball pitcher
 John Garland Pollard, U.S. politician